is a Japanese former AV idol, gravure model and actress.

Life and career
Rika Hoshimi was born on September 20, 1990 in Shizuoka Prefecture, Japan. She was first active as a centerfold model, and she debuted on video in May 2010 with the gravure (non-nude) release Emanechio (エマネチオ), which was filmed in Bali.

In September 2011 she switched from gravure modeling to the adult video (AV) industry, debuting in AV Decision, released by Muteki, a label specializing in celebrities making their adult video debuts. Four months later she debuted at the studio Idea Pocket with First Impression Rika Hoshimi, directed by Tadanori Usami, released on January 1, 2012. She became an exclusive actress for the studio between 2012 and 2014. She also appeared in IP PLATINUM GIRLS COLLECTION 2012, released on November 19, 2012. The film shows Hoshimi partaking in a special photo session in America organized by the studio and accompanied by other famous AV actresses signed under Idea Pocket including Kaho Kasumi, Jessica Kizaki, Rio, Aino Kishi, Minori Hatsune and Emiri Okazaki.

In 2013 Hoshimi starred in the Haruhi Oguri's youth-oriented drama film Bad Communication. She also appeared in several other films like Schoolgirl Blackboard Jungle and Undressing Mahjong Gakuen Z On April 19, 2014 she starred in her last AV with Idea Pocket Gang Bang Rika Hoshimi. She transferred to veteran AV studio K.M. Produce and debuted on June 13, 2014 with Hyper Super Star Rika Hoshimi, directed by Zack Arai. Hoshimi remained an exclusive performer for K.M. Produce for the next two years, appearing along with the studio's other actresses Sakura Kizuna, Yuu Aisaka and Miko Sakasaki in Million Dream 2014 Absolute Body Battle Ikamon and "Ika" Se Great Battle Special where the four girls perform in a large variety of situations and costumes. She also starred in the AV  Best Blend 6 where she performed her first (and only) girl-on-girl scene with Sakura Kizuna. She appeared in several VR releases as well.

Hoshimi retired from the AV industry at the end of 2016. Her last film, Retirement Rika Hoshimi, directed by Tiger Kosakai was released on December 9, 2016. The film is notable for being shot in documentary style of Hoshimi taking a trip to Thailand while also engaging in sexual activity. Despite her retirement from AV, she remained active on social media.

Filmography

Films 
 BAD communication (2013)
 Schoolgirl Blackboard Jungle (2013)
 Mysterious Gaia Sentai Ranger (2013)
High and Low (Datsui-mâjan gakuen Z) (2013)
 Sister of Summer (2014)

Gravure Videos 
 Emanechio (E-Net Frontier, May 21, 2010)
 Living with Africa (Air Control, July 25, 2010)
 Approaching (Air Control, September 25, 2010)

Adult Videos 
 AV Decision (Muteki, September 2011)
 First Impression (Idea Pocket, January 2012)
 Beautiful idol star Rika (Idea Pocket, February 2012)
 Squid Comfortably Star (Idea Pocket, March 2012)
 Let's at school! (Idea Pocket, April 2012)

Television 
 Please! Index (Asahi TV)
 Talk gravure audition (Fuji TV)
 Gyarusa (NTV)
 Girls On Film (MONDO21)
 BONZO big advance TV!! (TOKYO MX/MONDO21)
 Ani rub Chao (TV Tsukuba)
 PE time (TV Tsukuba)
 SHAKE! FREE TV (Aichi, TOKYO MX, Kyushu Broadcasting TVQ)
 Rank Kingdom (TBS)
 Peach Whisper (MONDO21)

Works

Photo Books 
 STARIKA (July 2011, photographed by: K. Yamaguchi), 
 ＊　ａｓｔｅｒｉｓｋ (September 2012, photographed by: Nogawa Isamu),

Magazines 
 Young Jump "Schoolgirl Uniform national collection" (Shueisha)
 Young Magazine "Girls BUTA fine black" (Kodansha)
 SPA! (Fuso)

References

External links 
  

1990 births
Japanese gravure idols
Japanese female adult models
Japanese pornographic film actresses
Living people
People from Shizuoka Prefecture